Tim Finocchiaro (born 19 June 1979) is a former Australian rules footballer who played with Geelong in the Australian Football League (AFL).

Finocchiaro won the Larke Medal in 1997, for his performances with Vic Metro. He played in the TAC Cup for Eastern Ranges, from where he was selected at pick 61 in the 1997 National Draft, but he was originally from Warrandyte. In 1998 he appeared in six of the opening eight rounds, but then fell ill with glandular fever. He played just four more games for Geelong, all in 1999.

References

External links
 
 

1979 births
Australian rules footballers from Victoria (Australia)
Geelong Football Club players
Eastern Ranges players
Living people